Timón is a ward (barrio) of Madrid belonging to the district of Barajas.

Wards of Madrid
Barajas (Madrid)